Beth N. Orcutt is an American oceanographer whose research focuses on the microbial life of the ocean floor. As of 2012, she is a Senior Research Scientist at the Bigelow Laboratory for Ocean Sciences. She is also a Senior Scientist of the Center for Dark Energy Biosphere Investigations, a Science and Technology Center funded by the National Science Foundation and headquartered at the University of Southern California and part of the Deep Carbon Observatory Deep Life Community. Orcutt has made fundamental contributions to the study of life below the seafloor, particularly in oceanic crust and has worked with the International Scientific Ocean Drilling Program.

Biography
Orcutt attended the University of Georgia, obtaining a BS degree in 2002 and a PhD in marine sciences in 2007, supervised by Samantha Joye. During her graduate studies she collaborated extensively with Antje Boetius at the Max Planck Institute for Marine Microbiology and Kai-Uwe Hinrichs at the University of Bremen, both in Bremen, Germany. She held postdoctoral positions at the University of Southern California (2007–2009) under Katrina Edwards and at the Aarhus University in Denmark (2009–2012) under Bo Barker Jørgensen. She joined the Bigelow Laboratory for Ocean Sciences in 2012. She has also been an adjunct assistant professor at the University of Southern California since 2009.

Orcutt’s research involves deep-sea exploration. Orcutt has traveled to the ocean’s seafloor several times aboard the submersibles Alvin and Johnson Sea Link. In 2015, she co-led an IODP scientific drilling Expedition 357 called “Atlantis Massif Serpentinization and Life” to explore life below the seafloor at the Atlantis Massif which hosts the Lost City hydrothermal field. This expedition was coordinated by ECORD and co-led with Gretchen Früh-Green of ETH Zurich. This expedition successfully used deep-sea drilling to collect rock samples from the mantle of the Atlantis Massif of the Mid-Atlantic Ridge, and showed that they contain hydrogen and methane. Orcutt’s research was featured in the documentary “North Pond: The Search for Intraterrestrials” which won “Best Documentary Feature Film” at the 2014 Yosemite International Film Festival and “Honorable Mention” at the 2014 Blue Ocean Film Festival.

References

External links

Center for Dark Energy Biosphere Investigations

Living people
University of Georgia alumni
Biogeochemists
Women marine biologists
American marine biologists
Year of birth missing (living people)